Mary Anne "Mean" Mendrez (born November 14, 1998) is a Filipino volleyball player of the UE Lady Warriors Volleyball Team in the University Athletic Association of the Philippines. She was awarded as the PSL Collegiate Grand Slam Second Best Outside Spiker.

Career
Mendrez is a member of the Under-19 Philippines women's national volleyball team which competed in the 2016 South East Asian Junior Women's Volleyball Championships where the team finished at the fourth place. In 2018, she joined Petro Gazz Angels in their journey in the Premier Volleyball League for two seasons where the team finished at the fourth place in the Open Conference. After the UAAP Season 81 Women's Volleyball, she will be suiting up for Generika-Ayala Lifesavers in their journey in the Philippine Super Liga.

Awards

Individual
 2018 PSL Collegiate Grand Slam Conference "2nd Best Outside Spiker"

Collegiate
 2018 PSL Collegiate Grand Slam Conference –  Bronze medal, with University of the East Lady Warriors

References

Living people
Filipino women's volleyball players
University of the East
1998 births
University Athletic Association of the Philippines volleyball players
People from San Pedro, Laguna
Outside hitters